Switzerland competed at the 1976 Winter Paralympics in Örnsköldsvik, Sweden. 15 competitors from Switzerland won 12 medals including 10 gold, 1 silver and 1 bronze and finished 2nd in the medal table.

Alpine skiing 

The medalists are:

  Eugen Diethelm Men's Giant Slalom II
  Felix Gisler Men's Slalom IV B
  Irene Moillen Women's Alpine Combination II
  Irene Moillen Women's Giant Slalom II
  Irene Moillen Women's Slalom II
  Heinz Moser Men's Alpine Combination III
  Heinz Moser Men's Giant Slalom III
  Heinz Moser Men's Slalom III
  Elisabeth Osterwalder Women's Giant Slalom IV A
  Eugen Diethelm Men's Alpine Combination II

Cross-country 

Five athletes represented Switzerland in cross-country skiing. One athlete won two medals:

  Germain Oberli Men's Short Distance 10 km A
  Germain Oberli Men's Middle Distance 15 km A

See also 

 Switzerland at the Paralympics
 Switzerland at the 1976 Winter Olympics

References 

1976
1976 in Swiss sport
Nations at the 1976 Winter Paralympics